"Llorar Lloviendo" (English: "Cry Raining") is a song by Puerto Rican-American singer and songwriter Toby Love. It was released on May 20, 2008, by Sony BMG Norte as the first single for Love's second studio album, Love Is Back (2008). Different remixes of the song were made with Bachata group Marcy Place, Periel & Jakziel (as an urban pop version), and one referred to as the Pokerface remix.

Charts

Certifications

References

2008 songs
2008 singles
Toby Love songs
Bachata songs
Sony BMG Norte singles
Spanglish songs
Spanish-language songs
Songs written by Wise (composer)